Valeria Aurora Miranda Rodríguez (born 25 August 1992) is a Mexican football defender who plays for the Mexico women's national team.

Club career

Pumas UNAM
Miranda joined Pumas UNAM at age 8.

Taylor Junior College
In July 2016, Miranda signed a two-year-contract with Tyler Junior College of Texas in the United States.

References

External links
 
 

1992 births
Living people
Footballers from Mexico City
2015 FIFA Women's World Cup players
Mexican women's footballers
Mexico women's international footballers
Women's association football defenders
Footballers at the 2015 Pan American Games
Pan American Games medalists in football
Pan American Games bronze medalists for Mexico
Mexican expatriate women's footballers
Mexican expatriate sportspeople in the United States
Expatriate women's soccer players in the United States
Medalists at the 2015 Pan American Games
20th-century Mexican women
21st-century Mexican women
Mexican footballers